William Auld (6 November 1924 – 11 September 2006) was a British poet, author, translator and magazine editor who wrote chiefly in Esperanto.

Life

Auld was born at Erith in Kent, and then moved to Glasgow with his parents, attending Allan Glen's School. After wartime service in the Royal Armed Forces, he studied English literature at Glasgow University, and then qualified as a teacher.

In 1960, he was appointed to a secondary school in Alloa and he remained there for the rest of his life. He was nominated for the Nobel Prize in Literature in 1999, 2004, and 2006, making him the first person nominated for works in Esperanto.

His masterpiece, La infana raso (The Infant Race), is a long poem that, in Auld's words, explores "the role of the human race in time and in the cosmos," and is partly based on The Cantos by Ezra Pound.

Auld began to learn Esperanto in 1937 but only became active in the propagation of the language in 1947, and from then on wrote many works in Esperanto. He edited various magazines and reviews, including Esperanto en Skotlando (1949–1955), Esperanto (1955–1958, 1961–1962), Monda Kulturo (1962–1963), Norda Prismo (1968–1972), La Brita Esperantisto (1973–1999) and Fonto (1980–1987).

He was Vice President of the Universal Esperanto Association (1977–1980), President of the Academy of Esperanto (1979–1983), and President of the Esperanto PEN Centre (1999–2005). He donated his personal collection of nearly 5000 books in and about Esperanto to the National Library of Scotland, where it is now housed, in 2001.

He died in Dolair/Dollar, Clackmannanshire and is buried in Dollar churchyard. The grave lies on the approach path to the church from the main road.

List of works

Collected poetry
Spiro de l' pasio (1952)
La infana raso (1956)
Unufingraj melodioj (1960)
Humoroj (1969)
Rimleteroj (with Marjorie Boulton, 1976)
El unu verda vivo (1978)
En barko senpilota (Edistudio, 1987)
Unu el ni (1992)

Anthologies
Angla antologio 1000–1800 (poetry editor, 1957)
Esperanta antologio (1958/1984)
25 jaroj (poetry editor, 1977)
Skota antologio (associate editor, 1978)
Sub signo de socia muzo (1987)
Nova Esperanta Krestomatio (1991)
Plena poemaro: Miĥalski (ed. 1994)
Tempo fuĝas (1996)

Translations from English
La balenodento, by Jack London (1952)
Epifanio, by Shakespeare (1977)
La urbo de terura nokto, by James Thomson (1977)
Don Johano, Kanto 1, by Lord Byron (1979)
La robaioj de Omar Kajam, by Edward Fitzgerald (1980)
La sonetoj, de Shakespeare (Edistudio, 1981)
Fenikso tro ofta, by Christopher Fry (1984)
Montara vilaĝo, by Chun-chan Je (1984)
La graveco de la Fideliĝo, by Oscar Wilde (1987)
La komedio de eraroj, by Shakespeare (with Asen M. Simeonov, 1987)
Omaĝoj. Poemtradukoj  (1987)
Gazaloj, by Hafiz (1988)
Spartako, by Leslie Mitchell (1993)
La stratoj de Aŝkelono, by Harry Harrison (1994)
Teri-strato, by Douglas Dunn (1995)
La kunularo de l' ringo, by J. R. R. Tolkien (1995)
La du turegoj, by J. R. R. Tolkien (1995)
La reveno de la reĝo, by J. R. R. Tolkien (1997)
La hobito, by J. R. R. Tolkien (poems and songs; with Christopher Gledhill, 2000)
La Hobito, aŭ Tien kaj Reen, by J. R. R. Tolkien (poems and songs; with Christopher Gledhill, Evertype 2015)
Kantoj, poemoj kaj satiroj, by Robert Burns (with Reto Rossetti, 1977)
Jurgen, by James Branch Cabell (2001)

Translations
Aniaro, by Harry Martinson (from Swedish with Bertil Nilsson, 1979)
Julia on Pandataria

Song collections
Floroj sen kompar' (with Margaret Hill, 1973), British folksongs translated into Esperanto 
Kantanta mia bird' (with Margaret Hill, 1973), British folksongs translated into Esperanto
Dum la noktoj (with Margaret and David Hill, 1976), original songs

Textbooks
Esperanto: A New Approach; (1965)
Paŝoj al plena posedo (1968)
A first course in Esperanto (1972)
Traduku!  (1993)

Bibliographies
Bibliografio de tradukoj el la angla lingvo (with E. Grimley Evans, 1996)

Essay collections
Facetoj de Esperanto (1976)
Pri lingvo kaj aliaj artoj (1978)
Enkonduko en la originalan literaturon de Esperanto (1979)
Vereco, distro, stilo (1981)
Kulturo kaj internacia lingvo (1986)
La fenomeno Esperanto (1988)
La skota lingvo, hodiaŭ kaj hieraŭ (1988)

Miscellaneous literature
Pajleroj kaj stoploj: elektitaj prozaĵoj (1997)

References

External links
The Infant Race – an English translation of La infana raso]
The Bairnlie Race – a Scots translation of La infana raso
An Cinneadh Leanabail – a Scots Gaelic translation of La infana raso
Septembra mateno
Rimleteroj (between William Auld and Marjorie Boulton)
Auld's poetry in English translation at Poems Found in Translation
"William Auld – Master Poet of Esperanto" by Girvan McKay. Includes 3 translations of Auld's work La infana raso into English, Scots & Gaelic
Concise Encyclopedia of the Original Literature of Esperanto: 1887–2007. Geoffrey Sutton, 2008. Mondial. , . Publisher's page for the book; accessed 4 December 2016.

1924 births
2006 deaths
Writers of Esperanto literature
Akademio de Esperanto members
Scottish essayists
Scottish non-fiction writers
Scottish schoolteachers
Scottish translators
Scottish song collectors
Scottish science fiction writers
Translators to Esperanto
Scottish magazine editors
People from Erith
Scottish Esperantists
20th-century Scottish poets
Scottish male poets
20th-century Scottish novelists
Scottish male novelists
20th-century British translators
20th-century essayists
20th-century British male writers
20th-century British writers
20th-century British musicologists
Royal Air Force personnel of World War II
Royal Air Force officers